Alatoseta is a genus of flowering plants in the family Asteraceae described as a genus in 1931.

There is only one known species, Alatoseta tenuis, endemic to the Cape Province region of South Africa.

References

Gnaphalieae
Monotypic Asteraceae genera
Endemic flora of South Africa
Plants described in 1931
Taxa named by Robert Harold Compton